Burlison and Grylls is an English company who produced stained glass windows from 1868 onwards.

The company of Burlison and Grylls was founded in 1868 at the instigation of the architects George Frederick Bodley and Thomas Garner. Both John Burlison (1843–1891) and Thomas John Grylls (1845–1913) had trained in the studios of Clayton and Bell.
 
After Thomas John Grylls' death in 1913, the firm was continued by his son Thomas Henry Grylls (1873-1953), a founder Fellow of the British Society of Master Glass Painters. Its London premises were bombed and records destroyed in 1945 during WW2.

Examples of their work
Lady Chapel Windows, Rochester Cathedral, Rochester, Kent
St. Mary Magdalene's Church, Bolney, West Sussex
St Chrysostom's Church, Manchester
Church of the Holy Angels, Hoar Cross
St. Aldhelm's Church, Branksome, Poole
St Mary's Church, Eccleston, Cheshire 
All Saints, Wokingham, Berkshire
St James' Church, Swarkestone, Derbyshire: east window of three lights, 1876
St Michael's Church, Camden Town, London: a three-light window facing the resurrection chapel
 St Peter's Church, Winchester: south chapel windows
 St Nicholas Chapel, Little Coggeshall, east window
 St Mary's Church, Portsea
St Mary's Church, Hartley Wespall, Hampshire: windows following restoration by George Gilbert Scott in 1868
 St Andrew's Church, Jarrom Street, Leicester: two light window with circular light above, 1910
Radley College, Oxfordshire: a sequence of nine windows in the chapel, designed and installed between 1894 and 1917
Auckland Castle, County Durham: a series of windows in the chapel depicting the lives of the Northern Saints and of St Peter, installed in the 1880s.

See also
 British and Irish stained glass (1811–1918)
 Victorian Era 
 Gothic Revival

References

British stained glass artists and manufacturers